Paul Roos Gymnasium is a public, dual medium (Afrikaans & English) high school for boys in the town of Stellenbosch, Western Cape, South Africa, and opened on the 1st of March 1866 as Stellenbosch Gymnasium. It is the 12th oldest school in the country.

History 
In 1910, the school was renamed Stellenbosch Boys' High School and old boy Paul Roos became the sixth rector of the school where he served for thirty years. In 1946 the school moved to the new buildings in Krigeville and was renamed Paul Roos Gymnasium after Paul Roos, old boy and captain of the first Springbok team, was himself a teacher at the school, and was the school's rector from 1910 to 1940, after which the school was renamed in his honour.

A notable characteristic of the school is its gees (Afrikaans for spirit) and their famous fight song "Old boys of Paul Roos" which is the melody of Flower of Scotland in remembrance of the first three Scottish rectors, which they sing with their old boys.

Paul Roos Gymnasium has produced more Springbok rugby players than any other school (54). It is also the school with the most players in the 2019 Rugby World Cup including five Springboks namely Schalk Brits, Willie le Roux, Steven Kitshoff, Herschel Jantjies, Damian Willemse and Braam Steyn who played for Italy.

Associations and facilities
Though Paul Roos Gymnasium is a school for boys from grade 8 to 12, the curriculum includes some subjects presented in conjunction with the two sister schools, Hoër Meisieskool Bloemhof and Rhenish. The school is dual medium; Afrikaans- and English-speaking pupils study under one roof, but classes are largely separated according to mother tongue. The school shares sport and internet facilities with Stellenbosch University.

School facilities include a library and computer labs.

Sports facilities include hockey fields, the Markötter rugby fields, a swimming pool, an Olympic Waterpolo Aquatic Centre, tennis courts, and a gymnasium.

The main residential facilities are the two school hostels (dormitories) called Prima and Prima Nova. They accommodate 245 boarders, mainly from South Africa and Namibia.

Sport 
Paul Roos Gymnasium has been performing very well on sports during the year.

 Archery 
 Athletics 
 Chess 
 Cricket
 Cross country 
 Equestrian 
 Golf 
 Hockey 
 Mountain biking 
 Rugby 
 Rugby sevens 
 Soccer 
 Squash 
 Swimming
 Table tennis 
 Tennis
 Water polo

Notable attainments
Paul Roos was classified as a 'prestige' school, being among the best-performing schools.
In 2018 the University of Stellenbosch, which evolved out of this school, celebrated its centenary. In the first 100 years of its existence, 26 old boys received honorary doctorates from this university more than any other school in the country. Also, since the inception of the Chancellor's Medal in 1961, thirteen old boys were awarded this medal for the best final year student by Stellenbosch University.

Notable alumni 

 Andries Bekker, rugby player
 Schalk Brits, rugby player
 Stefan de Bod, cyclist
 Boy de Villiers, rugby player
 Daniël de Waal, Judge President of the Transvaal Provincial Division
 Nicolaas Jacobus de Wet, judge and Chief Justice of South Africa
 Tom Dreyer, novelist, poet and column writer
 Dieter Eiselen, NFL player
 Justin Harding, golfer
 Etienne van Heerden, twice Hertzog Prize winner
 J.B.M. Hertzog, prime minister of the Union of South Africa.
 Garrick Higgo, Professional golfer
 T.O. Honiball artist and cartoonist
 Francois Hougaard, rugby player
 Herschel Jantjies, rugby player
 Gideon Joubert, writer and journalist
 Steven Kitshoff, rugby player
 Koos Kombuis, South African short-story writer, poet, novelist and cult musician
 Uys Krige, Hertzog Prize winner, writer, poet, playwright and rugby union footballer
 Juandré Kruger, rugby player 
 Tjol Lategan, rugby player
 Willie le Roux, Wasps and current Springbok rugby union player
 Robbie Louw, rugby union player
 Anton Lubowski, Namibian anti-apartheid activist and advocate.
 D.F. Malan, South African prime minister.
 Jannie Marais, benefactor of the Het Jan Marais Fonds
 Gerhardus Jacobus Maritz, Judge President of the Transvaal Provincial Division
 Jim McKendrick, rugby Player
 John Murray, judge and Chief Justice of Southern Rhodesia
 Pieter-Louis Myburgh, investigative journalist
 Paul Roos, Springbok rugby union captain
 Johann Rupert, business executive
 Jan Smuts, South African prime minister and Field Marshal in the British Army, as well as one of the founders of the League of Nations and United Nations.
 Josh Strauss, Scottish international rugby player
 Benjamin Tindall, judge
 Peter van der Merwe, cricketer.
 Marcel van Heerden, actor
 Anton van Niekerk, professor of Philosophy
 Arnold van Wyk, composer, musicologist
 Hendrik Stephanus van Zyl, Judge President of the Cape Provincial Division
 Wilhelm Verwoerd, philosopher, peace-maker and writer
 Cobus Visagie, accountant and former Springbok rugby player
 Ernest Frederick Watermeyer, Chief Justice of South Africa
 Damian Willemse, rugby player
 Heinz Winckler, musician
 John Trengove, former judge in the Appellate Division and Constitutional Court
 Pieter Andries Meyer, current judge in the Supreme Court of Appeal

Rhodes Scholarship
The Rhodes Scholarship was instituted in 1903, and Paul Roos is one of four schools in South Africa entitled to award a Rhodes Scholarship annually to an ex-pupil to study at the University of Oxford.

References

External links 
Paul Roos official site
Western Cape Education Department profile

Boarding schools in South Africa
Educational institutions established in 1866
Schools in the Western Cape
Bilingual schools in South Africa
Stellenbosch
Gymnasiums in South Africa
1866 establishments in the Cape Colony